Reginald, Reg or Reggie Smith may refer to:

Sports

American football
 Reggie Smith (wide receiver) (born 1956), American football player
 Reggie L. Smith (born 1962), American football player
 Reggie Smith (defensive back) (born 1986), American football player

Association football (soccer)
 Reg Smith (footballer, born 1903) (1903–after 1932), English footballer with Brighton & Hove Albion
 Reg Smith (1912–2004), English footballer and manager
 Reg Smith (footballer, born 1916) (1916–?), English footballer with Bristol City, Wolves, Tranmere

Other sports
 Reginald Smith (cricketer) (1868–1943), English cricketer
 Reg Smith (Australian footballer) (1902–1963), Australian rules footballer with Fitzroy
 Hooley Smith (Reginald Joseph Smith, 1903–1963), Canadian ice hockey player
 Reggie Smith (born 1945), American baseball player and coach
 Reggie Smith (basketball) (born 1970), American basketball player
 Reggie Smith (Northeastern Illinois basketball) (born  1970/71), American basketball player

Others
 Reginald Allender Smith (1873–1940), British archaeologist, Keeper of British and Medieval Antiquities at the British Museum 1927–1938
 Reginald Smith-Rose (1894–1980), English physicist
 R. D. Smith (Reginald Donald Smith, 1914–1985), English lecturer and radio producer
 Reginald A. Smith (Canadian politician) (born 1928), Canadian politician
 Marty Wilde (Reginald Leonard Smith, born 1939), English singer and songwriter
 Reginald Arthur Smith (fl. 1941), British author
 Reggie Smith (Texas politician) (born 1969), American politician

See also
 Reg Smythe